The Hino Rainbow (kana:日野・レインボー) is a medium-duty single-decker bus marketed by the Japanese manufacturer Hino since 1980. The range can be built as either a complete bus or a bus chassis. It was also available for the city bus for the midibus and the tourist coach for the minibus. Asia Motors (now Kia Motors) released as a badge engineered version called the Cosmos. It is built by J-Bus.

RL (1970-1980) 
RL100 (1970)
RL300/320 (1975)
K-RL301/321 (1980)

Rainbow RJ/RR (1980-2004) 
First generation (1980-1988)
K-RJ/RR170/172/192 (1980)
P-RJ/RR170/172/192 (1984)
Second generation(1988-2004)
P-RJ/RR170/172/192 (1988)
U-RR2HGAA (1990)
U-RJ/RR3H (1990)
KC-RJ/RR1J (1995)
KK-RJ/RR1J (1999)

Rainbow AM (1976-1983) 
AM100 (1976)
K-AM101 (1980)

Rainbow AC (1983-1988) 
P-AC140 (1983)

Rainbow RB/AB (1985-1995) 
The Rainbow RB (rear engine)/AB (front engine) was a minibus that was built as the tourist coach.
P-RB145/AB115 (1985)
U-RB1W/AB2W (1990)

Rainbow 7M(CH)/7W(RH) (1987-1998) 
P-CH/RH160 (1987)
U-CH/RH3 (1990)
KC-CH/RH1 (1995)

Rainbow HR (1999-2010) 
The Rainbow HR was a rebadged Isuzu Erga-J and a non-step (low-entry) city bus. The HR1J engine is J08C 220ps 6-cylinder 8-litre diesel engine. The HR7J engines J07E 225ps 5-cylinder 7-litre diesel engine with a turbocharger and intercooler.
KK-HR1J (1999) - 7m/9m
KL-HR1J (2000) - 10.5m
PB-HR7J (2004) - 9m
PK-HR7J (2004) - 10.5m
BDG-HR7J (2007) - 10.5m

Rainbow II (2004-2016) 
The Rainbow II is a rebadged Isuzu Erga Mio. It is most common available in non-step (low-floor) city buses and they have a rounded roof dome (more rounded than the Rainbow HR) with a double-curvature windscreen and a separately mounted destination blind.
 PA-KR234J1 (2004)
 PDG-KR234J2 (2007)
 SDG-KR290J1 (2011)
 SKG-KR290J1 (2012)

Rainbow (2016-present) 
The Rainbow is a rebadged Isuzu Erga Mio. It is completely similar to the Rainbow II, with a rounded roof dome (similar to the Rainbow II), a double-curvature windscreen with a separately mounted destination blind.
 SKG-KR290J2 (2016)

References

External links 

Hino Blue Ribbon and Rainbow homepage (in Japanese)

Rainbow
Bus chassis
Buses of Japan
Low-entry buses
Low-floor buses
Midibuses
Minibuses
Step-entrance buses
Vehicles introduced in 1970